= Raise Gruppen =

Norwegian hair and beauty company

Raise Gruppen (formerly Nikita Gruppen) is a Norwegian hair and beauty company. It has salons in Norway and Sweden.

The company was founded in 1984 by Inger Ellen Nicolaisen. It operates under the brands Nikita Hair, Hair Barber Shop, Alex Verdini, Preus Barber Events, Head Masters and Norwegian Hair and Skin Care School.
